The Silence and the Serenity was a short-lived metal band from Poughkeepsie, New York. They formed in 2005 under the name Bless the Fallen.

After self-releasing their debut EP, So Dark the Crown of Man, they signed a deal with Crash Music Inc., who released their debut full-length album, The Eclectic Sounds of a City Painted Black and White in 2007, described by Allmusic as "a routine screamo/metalcore blend that contains occasional hints of death metal and black metal". Despite calling the recording quality of the album "terrible", Exclaim! described the album as "a fun, nostalgic metal fight".

After months of inactivity, Bartsch and Privitera would go on to form Dead Empires with long-time friend John Bryan. They recorded a 4-song EP entitled "Monuments" that was mastered by current Guns N' Roses guitarist Bumblefoot. In the spring of 2012, Dead Empires entered The Isokon studio in Woodstock, N.Y. under the guidance of D. James Goodwin to complete a full-length album entitled "Waiting In Waves". It currently has a release date of August 2012.

In the summer of 2011, Drummer Phil Bartsch and Guitarist Kyle Behnken joined the Poughkeepsie Ska-Punk band The Raddigan Brothers Noise Experience. The band is currently signed to bassist and lead vocalist Mike Dietz' record label P.I.F.F. ("Punk Is Fucking Fun") Records.

Members
Mikey Fraleigh - vocals
Nick Privitera - bass guitar
Phil Bartsch - drums
Kyle Jackson - guitar, vocals
Kyle Behnken - guitar

Former members
Dan  - vocals (on So Dark the Crown of Man)
Kenny- vocals
Dan - guitar
Will - guitar

Discography
So Dark the Crown of Man (2006) (EP)
The Eclectic Sounds of a City Painted Black and White (2007), Crash Music Inc.
Demo EP (2008) - as The Silence and the Serenity

References

Metalcore musical groups from New York (state)
American deathcore musical groups